Don't Lose Your Head is a 1967 British swashbuckling comedy film, the 13th in the series of 31 Carry On films (1958–1992). It features regular team members Sid James, Kenneth Williams, Jim Dale, Charles Hawtrey, and Joan Sims. Set in France and England in 1789 during the French Revolution, it is a parody of Baroness Orczy's The Scarlet Pimpernel.

The first Carry On to be produced by the Rank Organisation, Don't Lose Your Head, was not conceived as a part of the series and was first released without the Carry On prefix. However, the ongoing popularity of the series persuaded Rank to add the prefix to the titles of this and the following film, Follow That Camel, when they were re-released.

French actress Dany Robin makes here her only Carry On appearance.

Plot
It is the time of the French Revolution. Whilst the French aristocracy is losing their heads (literally), two bored English noblemen, Sir Rodney Ffing (pronounced "Effing") and his best friend Lord Darcy Pue (played by Sid James and Jim Dale respectively), bored with the endless rounds of country pursuits, decide to have some fun and save their French counterparts from beheading by the guillotine.

The enraged and incompetent revolutionary leader, Citizen Camembert (Kenneth Williams), and his toadying lackey, Citizen Bidet (Peter Butterworth), scour France for the elusive saviour of the nobles, who is nicknamed “The Black Fingernail” after his calling card of “two digits rampant”. After a series of audacious rescues, the Fingernail succeeds in rescuing the Duc de Pommfrit (Charles Hawtrey) whilst disguised as an insurance salesman, and in the process, tricks Camembert into guillotining his own executioner. Camembert is chastised by his superior Maximillien Robespierre (Peter Gilmore) and threatened with the guillotine, unless he captures the Fingernail.

During his escape from France, Sir Rodney meets his true love, Jacqueline (Dany Robin), leaving her with a silver locket containing a set of his mother’s false teeth. On discovering Jacqueline, Camembert and Bidet imprison her. Using the locket as a trap, they travel to England to uncover the real identity of The Black Fingernail. They are accompanied by Camembert’s lover, Desirée (Joan Sims), who is on the lookout to marry a man with a title, disguised as the Comte and Comtesse de la Plume de ma Tante. Desirée pretends to be Camembert's flamboyant sister, whilst wearing the locket.

After a series of intrigues at a ball at Ffing House, everyone’s identity is unknowingly revealed. Foppish Sir Rodney challenges Camembert to a rigged duel in order to get a head start on his journey to Paris to rescue Jacqueline. Desirée is now herself in love with the hero and will do all she can to save him from the guillotine in return for his promise that she will marry her titled man.

On arrival in Paris, the Fingernail discovers that Jacqueline has been moved from the Bastille to the Château Neuf (Waddesdon Manor), the former home of an avid art collector and member of the aristocracy, recently presented to Citizen Camembert - by himself. Ffing, Lord Darcy, and the Duc de Pommfrit travel there to rescue her. During the ensuing fight between the rescuers and the French soldiers, most of Camembert’s new art collection is destroyed. With the help of Desirée, Jacqueline is rescued. All five flee the collapsing château to safety, whilst Camembert and Bidet attempt to stop it from falling down.

For their incompetence, Robespierre orders the execution of Camembert and Bidet on a double guillotine. They are relieved to know that the Fingernail is not there to see it, until the executioner reveals that he is The Black Fingernail himself. Afterwards, in England, Ffing marries Jacqueline, who becomes Lady Ffing, whilst he keeps his promise to Desirée, who has married the Duc de Pommfrit (as he has a title), much to her own chagrin.

Cast

Sid James as Sir Rodney Ffing/The Black Fingernail
Kenneth Williams as Citizen Camembert
Jim Dale as Lord Darcy Pue
Charles Hawtrey as Duc de Pommfrit
Joan Sims as Desiree Dubarry
Peter Butterworth as Citizen Bidet
Dany Robin as Jacqueline
Peter Gilmore as Maximilien Robespierre
Marianne Stone as Landlady
Michael Ward as Henri
Leon Greene as Malabonce
Richard Shaw as Captain
David Davenport as Sergeant
Jennifer Clulow as 1st lady
Valerie Van Ost as 2nd lady
Jacqueline Pearce as 3rd lady
Hugh Futcher as Guard (uncredited)
Nikki van der Zyl as Messenger (uncredited)
Julian Orchard as Rake (uncredited)
Elspeth March as Lady Binder (uncredited)
Joan Ingram as Bald dowager (uncredited)
Michael Nightingale as "What locket?" man (uncredited)
Diana MacNamara as Princess Stephanie (uncredited)
Ronnie Brody as Little man (uncredited)
Billy Cornelius as Soldier (uncredited)
Patrick Allen as Narrator (uncredited)
Monica Dietrich as Girl (uncredited)
Anna Willoughby as Girl (uncredited)
Penny Keen as Girl (uncredited)
June Cooper as Girl (uncredited)
Christine Pryor as Girl (uncredited)
Karen Young as Girl (uncredited)

Filming and locations
Filming dates – 12 September–28 October 1966

Interiors:
 Marble Hall, Clandon House, Guildford, Surrey, England
 Pinewood Studios, Buckinghamshire

Exteriors:
 Clandon House, Guildford, Surrey, England
 Claydon Park, Claydon, Buckinghamshire, England
 Cliveden, Buckinghamshire, England, UK
 Waddesdon Manor, Waddesdon, Buckinghamshire, England, UK
 Black Park, Buckinghamshire, England, UK

Bibliography

References

External links 
 

1966 films
British parody films
British historical comedy films
1960s English-language films
Carry On films
Films directed by Gerald Thomas
Scarlet Pimpernel films
1960s parody films
1960s historical comedy films
Films set in 1789
Films shot at Pinewood Studios
Films produced by Peter Rogers
1960s British films
English-language comedy films